Shunkawauken Falls is a  waterfall located in Polk County, near Columbus, North Carolina. The falls are fed by a pond a few metres upstream. It is a local attraction, although it is located on private property.

According to local lore, a Native American chief named Shunkawauken lived in this area in the 1800s. The falls, previously named Horse Creek Falls, were renamed in his memory in 1891.

See also
List of waterfalls in North Carolina

References

Waterfalls of North Carolina
Landforms of Polk County, North Carolina